Franklin Road Christian School (FRCS) can refer to:
Franklin Road Christian School (Novi, Michigan)
Franklin Road Christian School (Tennessee)